Proto-Chukotko-Kamchatkan is the reconstructed common ancestor of the Chukotko-Kamchatkan languages. It is purported to have broken up into the Northern (Chukotian) and Southern (Itelmen) branches around 2000 BCE, when western reindeer herders moved into the Chukotko-Kamchatkans' homeland and its inland people adopted the new lifestyle.

A reconstruction is presented by Michael Fortescue in his Comparative Dictionary of Chukotko-Kamchatkan (2005).

Phonology
According to Fortescue, Proto-Chukotko-Kamchatkan had the following phonemes, expressed in IPA symbols.

Consonants

 is a true voiceless palatal stop (not the affricate č). Note that Proto-Chukotko-Kamchatkan had only voiceless stops, no voiced stops (such as ). However, there is a series of voiced fricatives, . These have no voiceless counterparts (such as ).

 is a voiced labiodental fricative (like v in English).  is a voiced velar fricative (like the g in Dutch ogen, modern Greek gamma, Persian qāf, etc.).  is a voiced uvular fricative (like r in French).

The entire  series is alveolar — i.e.  are not dentals.

Vowels

Grammar
It is generally accepted that Proto-Chukotko-Kamchatkan had an eleven-case system for nouns, but Dibella Wdzenczny has hypothesised that these evolved from only six cases in Pre-Proto-Chukotko-Kamchatkan. Below is the reconstructed case system of Proto-Chukotko-Kamchatkan.

1Note that the (mostly inanimate) nouns of the first declension only marked plurality in the absolutive case.

The protolanguage is thought to have been a nominative-accusative language, with the current Chukotko-Kamchatkan ergative aspects coming later in the (Northern) Chukotian branch, possibly through contact with nearby Eskimo–Aleut-speaking peoples. This would explain why Itelmen, spoken further south than any Eskimo–Aleut speakers visited, lacks ergative structures. Some linguists, however, maintain that Proto-Chukotko-Kamchatkan began as an ergative language and lost that feature over time.

See also

 Chukotko-Kamchatkan languages
 Uralo-Siberian languages

References

Proto
Chukotko-Kamchatkan